Mohammad Abdul Latif (born 10 November 1939, Kamptee, Maharashtra, India), also known as Mohammad Abdul Latif Khan and M.A. Latif, is a former first-class cricketer for East Pakistan, a retired senior officer in the Bangladesh armed services, and a cricket administrator.

Playing career
A middle-order batsman and leg-spinner, Latif made his first-class debut for East Pakistan Greens in 1956–57. In his first five matches spread over four seasons he made only 66 runs and took two wickets.

In 1961–62 he captained East Pakistan in the Quaid-e-Azam Trophy. Against Hyderabad he scored 109 and 49 and took 3 for 49 and 3 for 112 to play the leading part in East Pakistan's first victory in first-class cricket. Later that season he played for a Combined XI against the touring MCC in Bahawalpur, and was the only local player selected for a match in Dacca between the East Pakistan Governor's XI and the touring International XI. However, he achieved little in either match.

Latif top-scored with 81 for a President's XI against the Commonwealth XI in 1963–64. Captaining Dacca in the Ayub Trophy in 1964–65 he scored 155 not out in a victory over Rajshahi.

When Ceylon toured Pakistan in 1966–67, Latif played for a President's XI against the tourists, making 42 not out in the second innings to enable his team to avoid defeat. He played for Pakistan in Dacca in the second of the three representative matches against Ceylon, scoring 21 and not bowling. Again he was the only East Pakistan player in the side. For a President's XI against the MCC Under-25 side in Rawalpindi later that season he scored 74 out of the first innings total of 157, playing "some exciting strokes".

From then on, Latif played only domestic cricket, despite a remarkable performance with the ball in two matches in January 1968. Captaining East Pakistan Greens against Dacca University in the Ayub Trophy, he took 7 for 19 and 5 for 40 in an innings victory, then a few days later against East Pakistan Railways he took 7 for 19 and 5 for 19 (as well as scoring 50) in another innings victory. His 24 wickets for 97 included 18 victims bowled. In the semi-final of the Ayub Trophy that followed immediately, however, he took only 1 for 75 in an innings loss.

He scored 143 and 42 and took two wickets when East Pakistan defeated Hyderabad Whites in 1969–70. After two matches in 1970–71 he played no further first-class cricket.

Later career
Latif did his military training at the Pakistan Military Academy, and served in the Bangladesh military after Bangladesh achieved independence in 1971, rising to the rank of lieutenant colonel.

He managed the Bangladesh cricket team's tours to Australia and Pakistan in 2003, and to England and Sri Lanka in 2005. He was chairman of the Bangladesh Cricket Board's development committee from 2007 to 2008, and also served as vice-president of the Board.

In the 2010s, he served as the sports secretary for the Bangladesh National Party. He has also been an international boxing referee.

References

External links
 Abdul Latif at CricketArchive

Bangladeshi military personnel
Bangladeshi cricket administrators
1939 births
Living people
East Pakistan cricketers
Cricketers from Dhaka